N' Savenni  is a village and rural commune in Hodh El Gharbi, Mauritania.

References 

Communes of Mauritania